Pasthal is a census town in Thane district in the Indian state of Maharashtra.

now pasthal comes in palghar district after the taluka pasthal is converted to district.

Demographics
 India census, Pasthal had a population of 16,185. Males constitute 53% of the population and females 47%. Pasthal has an average literacy rate of 82%, higher than the national average of 59.5%: male literacy is 86%, and female literacy is 79%. In Pasthal, 13% of the population is under 6 years of age.

References

Cities and towns in Thane district